Everything Is Expensive is the third studio album by Canadian singer-songwriter Esthero, released on October 30, 2012. The album's lead single, "Never Gonna Let You Go", was released in June 2012.

The album was self-released by Esthero, with a distribution deal through Universal Music in Canada. On September 24, 2012, Esthero signed the project up to PledgeMusic, offering a wide variety of exclusive packages, such as a Korean BBQ with her, a handmade clutch purse, finger paintings and signed CDs.

Critical reception
"Everything Is Expensive" garnered mixed to negative reviews from music critics. Maria Sokulsky-Dolnycky, writing for Spill, awarded the album 2 out of 5 stars, praising Esthero's vocal performance but concluding that "the songs lack substance and memorability," going on to call the album "lacklustre at best." Now Think Free's review, written by Anupa Mistry, was similarly negative, stating that the album "is a tepid, confused palette for a musician who displayed a fierce individuality in the past," though praising Esthero's vocals. 2020k praised the album's vulnerability and audio engineering.

Chart performance
The album debuted at number 13 on the US Heatseekers album chart, also reaching two regional charts, the Pacific and South Atlantic Heatseekers charts, where it peaked at numbers 4 and 10, respectively.

Track listing

Charts

References

2012 albums
Esthero albums
Folk albums by Canadian artists